Bustard Green is a hamlet in the civil parish of  Lindsell, and the Uttlesford district of Essex, England, and is just under  north from the village of Lindsell.

Bustard Green has a Wild Essex site, which is home to bee orchids and turtle doves.

References

Uttlesford
Hamlets in Essex